Hopae were identification tags carried by Koreans during the Joseon dynasty, recording the bearer's name, place of birth, status and residence. The tags consists of the persons name, birthdate, and where they were born. The hopae system helped the government in tax collection and retrieving runaway slaves.

History
The hopae system was initiated by King Taejong in 1413, apparently on the basis of a similar practice by the Yuan dynasty in China. Taejong declared that hopae must be carried by all males aged 16 and older. The desire to control migration was cited as a major reason behind the system in the edict which established the hopae law. However, it was abandoned only three years later in 1416, after the completion of the new household registry; this may have been because the hopae were no longer necessary after the completion of the registry, or the opposition which commoners demonstrated to the requirement of carrying hopae. The hopae system was promulgated and abolished several times in the following years.

King Sejo revived the system in 1458, again with the aim of controlling the movement of people, this time in order to aid in suppressing the rebellion by Yi Jing-ok in Hamgil Province, which found widespread support among peasants who had fled from their homes; the law would remain in effect for twelve more years.

Hopae again fell into disuse, but were revived by Prince Gwanghae in the early 17th century. One game played with dominoes in modern Korea takes its name from the hopae.

People of different social classes wore different coloured tags. The yangban class wore yellow, high-ranking yangban officials wore ivory while the lower-ranks wore ones of deer horn. Commoners wore small wooden tags while slaves carried large wooden ones.

References

Notes

Sources

External links
 Pictures of hopae from the Academy of Korean Studies 
 Pictures of hopae from Museum.co.kr

Joseon dynasty
Korean caste system
Identity documents